Alticorpus mentale is a species of haplochromine cichlid in the family Cichlidae. It is endemic to Lake Malawi, occurring in the southern part of the lake within Malawi.  Its natural habitat is freshwater lakes.

References

Fish of Malawi
mentale
Taxa named by Jay Richard Stauffer Jr.
Taxa named by Kenneth Robert McKaye
Fish described in 1988
Taxonomy articles created by Polbot
Fish of Lake Malawi